Phaseolus coccineus, known as runner bean, scarlet runner bean, or multiflora bean, is a plant in the legume family, Fabaceae. Another common name is butter bean, which, however, can also refer to the lima bean, a different species.

It is grown both as a food plant and an ornamental plant.

Description 
This species originated from the mountains of Central America. It was most likely cultivated in the highlands of Mexico and Guatemala around 2000 BC. Most varieties have red flowers and multicolored seeds (though some have white flowers and white seeds), and they are often grown as ornamental plants. The vine can grow to 3 m (9 ft) or more in length.

It differs from the common bean (P. vulgaris) in several respects: the cotyledons stay in the ground during germination, and the plant is a perennial vine with tuberous roots (though it is frequently treated as an annual in colder climates).

The knife-shaped pods are normally green; however, there are very rare varieties bred by amateurs that have very unusual purple pods. An example of such a purple-podded runner bean is 'Aeron Purple Star'.

Runner beans have also been called "Oregon lima bean", and in Nahuatl ayocotl or in Spanish ayocote. Runner beans, like all beans, contain the toxic protein phytohaemagglutinin and thus should be cooked well before eating.

Usage 

Runner beans were grown as food plants in North America and Europe from the 1600s, and also as ornamentals for their attractive flowers. However, they came to be used primarily as a garden ornamental plant in North America, including for temporary screening. The flowers attract hummingbirds, bees and other insects. In the UK and other European countries – where the vegetable is a popular choice for kitchen gardens and allotments – the flowers came to be ignored, or treated as an attractive bonus to cultivating the plant for the beans. 

The seeds of the plant can be used fresh or as dried beans. The pods are eaten whole while young and not yet fibrous. The starchy roots of this perennial are eaten in Mesoamerica.

The beans are used in many cuisines. It is a popular side vegetable in British cuisine. A variety named 'Judión de la Granja' producing large, white, edible beans is cultivated in San Ildefonso, Spain. It is the basis of a Segovian regional dish also named Judiones de la Granja, in which the beans are mixed with pig's ears, pig's trotters, and chorizo, amongst other ingredients.

In Greece, cultivars of the runner bean with white blossom and white beans are known as fasolia gigantes (φασόλια γίγαντες). They are grown under protective law in the north of Greece within the regions of Kato Nevrokopi, Florina and Kastoria. The beans have an important role in Greek cuisine, appearing in many dishes (such as Gigandes plaki). In English, they are sometimes colloquially referred to as elephant beans. In Austria the coloured versions are cultivated and served as "Käferbohnen" ("beetle-bean"), a dish made of the dry beans with pumpkin seed oil. It is considered a typical dish of regional Austrian cuisine, but dried runner beans are also consumed to a small extent in Germany.

Greece and northern Africa are the sources of pods of the runner beans sold as "green beans" in European markets during the cold period. The pods can be identified by their big size and the rougher surface.

Cultivars include:
 'Aeron Purple Star' (not available commercially)
 'Black Runner'
 'Butler'
 'Case Knife'
 'Hammond's Dwarf'
 'Painted Lady'
 'Pickwick Dwarf'
 'Polestar'
 'Scarlet Runner'
 'White Dutch Runner'

P. coccineus subsp. darwinianus  is a cultivated subspecies, commonly referred to as the botil bean in Mexico.

The related species considered most useful for interbreeding with P. coccineus to increase its genetic diversity are P. dumosus and P. vulgaris.

References

External links
 
 

coccineus
Crops originating from the Americas
Edible legumes
Perennial vegetables
Plants described in 1753
Taxa named by Carl Linnaeus